Scituate is a seacoast town in Plymouth County, Massachusetts, United States, on the South Shore, midway between Boston and Plymouth.  The population was 19,063 at the 2020 census.

History

The Wampanoag and their neighbors have inhabited the lands Scituate now stands on for thousands of years. The name Scituate is derived from "satuit", the Wampanoag term for cold brook, which refers to a brook that runs to the inner harbor of the town.  In 1710, several European colonizers emigrated to Rhode Island and founded Scituate, Rhode Island, naming it after their previous hometown.

European colonization brought a group of people from Plymouth about 1627, who were joined by colonizers from the county of Kent in England.  They were initially governed by the General Court of Plymouth, but on October 5, 1636, the town incorporated as a separate entity.  

The Williams-Barker House, which still remains near the harbor, was built in 1634. Twelve homes and a sawmill were destroyed in King Philip's War in 1676.

In 1717, the western portion of the original land grant was separated and incorporated as the town of Hanover, and in 1788, a section of the town was ceded to Marshfield.  In 1849, another western section became the town of South Scituate, which later changed its name to Norwell. Since then, the borders have remained essentially unchanged.

Fishing was a significant part of the local economy in the past, as was the sea mossing industry. The sea was historically an integral part of the town with occasional incidents such as that described February 13, 1894, in which eight men clinging to the vessel's rigging on a schooner grounded off Third Cliff apparently died before a large crowd watching from shore "literally frozen to the ropes" while unsuccessful rescue efforts continued through the day and their apparently lifeless bodies were covered by nightfall. A small fishing fleet is still based in Scituate Harbor, although today the town is mostly residential.

In 1810, a lighthouse was erected on the northern edge of Scituate Harbor. This lighthouse is now known as Old Scituate Light. During the War of 1812, a British naval raiding party having landed on the beach near the lighthouse was deterred by the two daughters of the lighthouse keeper. The young girls, Abigail and Rebecca Bates, marched to and fro behind sand dunes playing a fife and drum loudly. The British invaders were duped into thinking that the American army was approaching and fled. The girls and this incident became known as the "American Army of Two" or "Lighthouse Army of Two". Descendants of the Bates family still remain in Scituate.

The Minot’s Ledge Lighthouse (also known as Minot’s Light) has been nicknamed the "I Love You Lighthouse" due to the 1–4–3 pattern that its light repeatedly emits.

Samuel Woodworth's Old Oaken Bucket house is located in Scituate. The town is also home to the Lawson Tower, a water tower surrounded by a wooden façade, with an observation deck with views of most of the South Shore from the top.

Financier and muckraker Thomas Lawson built his Dreamworld estate in Scituate. The Lawson Tower remains and the Dreamworld condominium complex pays tribute.

During World War II, the Fourth Cliff Military Reservation defended the Scituate area with a battery of two 6-inch guns. It is now a recreation area for Hanscom Air Force Base.

Scituate used to be the site of international broadcasting radio station WNYW, which broadcast on the shortwave bands in the late 1960s.

Geography
Scituate is bordered on the east by Massachusetts Bay, on the south by Marshfield, on the west by Norwell and Hingham, all of which are in Plymouth County, and on the northwest by Cohasset, in Norfolk County.

Scituate is considered a South Shore community, located just south of the mouth of greater Boston Harbor.  The town is not contiguous; Humarock is a part of Scituate which can only be reached from Marshfield.  The latter was formerly connected to the town, but that connection was lost when the mouth of the South River shifted northward as the result of the Portland Gale of 1898.  The town's shore varies, with the south (along the mouth of the North River) being surrounded by salt marshes, the middle (around Scituate Harbor) being sandy, and the coast of Scituate Neck (Minot) in the north exhibiting exposed granite bedrock.  It is off these rocks that Minot's Ledge lies, home to the town's most famous lighthouse.  The inland of the town is mostly wooded, with several brooks and rivers (including Satuit or "Cold Brook", for which the town is named) running through.

Scituate has five public beaches:  Minot, Sand Hills, Egypt, Peggotty, and Humarock.

The town has no freeways running through it; Massachusetts Route 3 runs through neighboring Norwell.  Route 3A runs through the town, and is known as Chief Justice Cushing Highway for this stretch, named for Chief Justice William Cushing (1732–1810).  The only other state highway in town is Route 123, which terminates at Route 3A, just  from the town line.

There is no air service in town; the closest regional airport is Marshfield Municipal Airport, and the closest national and international air service is at Logan International Airport in Boston.  There are two MBTA commuter rail stations.  One is just off Route 3A in North Scituate, and the other is just east of the intersection of Routes 3A and 123 in the Greenbush neighborhood, which is the line's eastern terminus.  The line is connected to an existing line in Braintree, providing service to South Station in Boston.

Named places in the town include:
 Egypt
 First Cliff
 Greenbush (Green Bush)
 Hatherly
 Humarock
 Lawson Tower, a historic water tower which is visible from several miles out at sea
 Minot, including Minot Beach
 North Scituate (formerly Gannett Corner)
 Peggotty Beach
 Rivermoor
 Second Cliff
 Shore Acres
 Sodham
 The Glades
 Sand Hills
 The Connolly House
 Third Cliff
 Kent Village
 The West End
 The Spit
 The Point (original name of the Spit)
 Driftway

"The Harbor" refers to the business district as well as the harbor itself. Scituate Harbor is used mostly by pleasure boaters and fishermen.

At one time, dozens of commercial fishermen lived in Scituate, but the number has dwindled to just a handful.

Demographics

As of the census of 2010, there were 18,133 people, 6,694 households, and 4,920 families residing in the town. The racial makeup of the town was 96.1% White, 0.8% Black or African American, 0.1% Native American, 0.8% Asian, 0.01% Pacific Islander, 1.4% from other races, and 0.9% from two or more races. Hispanic or Latino of any race were 0.83% of the population.

There were 6,694 households, out of which 34.4% had children under the age of 18 living with them, 62.5% were married couples living together, 8.2% had a female householder with no husband present, and 26.5% were non-families. 22.2% of all households were made up of individuals, and 10.4% had someone living alone who was 65 years of age or older.  The average household size was 2.64 and the average family size was 3.13.

In the town, the population was spread out, with 26.1% under the age of 18, 4.2% from 18 to 24, 27.7% from 25 to 44, 26.8% from 45 to 64, and 15.3% who were 65 years of age or older.  The median age was 41 years.  For every 100 females, there were 91.3 males.  For every 100 females age 18 and over, there were 87.9 males.

The median income for a household in the town was $70,868, and the median income for a family was $86,058 (these figures had risen to $86,723 and $108,138 respectively as of a 2010 estimate)16.  Males had a median income of $60,322 versus $40,200 for females.  The per capita income for the town was $33,940.  About 1.4% of families and 2.6% of the population were below the poverty line, including 1.5% of those under age 18 and 4.8% of those age 65 or over.

Climate

In a typical year, Scituate's temperatures fall below  for 184 days per year. It may be helpful to understand the yearly precipitation by imagining 9 straight days of moderate rain per year. The humidity is below 60% for approximately 34.4 days or 9.4% of the year.

The town is highly prone to the effects of nor'easters, major storms that slam the region every winter. The strongest of these storms can produce devastating coastal flooding and hurricane force winds in Scituate and other coastal Massachusetts towns.

Transportation

There are no divided highways that run through Scituate, but there are two state roads, Route 3A and Route 123.  The nearest airport to Scituate is Marshfield Municipal Airport. The nearest national and international air service can be reached at Logan International Airport in Boston. T. F. Green Airport, located outside Providence, Rhode Island, is an alternative to Logan, although it is located farther away.

The Greenbush Line of the MBTA Commuter Rail begins in Scituate with the Greenbush station, proceeds north to Scituate's second stop, in North Scituate, where it continues to Cohasset and Hingham and finally South Station in Boston. The ride into Boston lasts approximately forty- five minutes.

In late 2015 the GATRA bus program was implemented in Scituate.  The program provides low-cost bus transportation within the town.

Government

On the national level, Scituate is a part of Massachusetts's 8th congressional district, and is currently represented by Stephen Lynch.

On the state level, all of Scituate's voting precincts are represented in the Massachusetts House of Representatives as a part of the Fourth Plymouth district, which also includes the town of Marshfield. Patrick Kearney was elected on November 6, 2018 as the state representative for these precincts. He will replace Jim Cantwell, who resigned to take a job with Ed Markey. Kearney was sworn in on January 2, 2019. The third precinct is a part of the Third Plymouth district, which includes Hingham, Hull and Cohasset, and is represented by Joan Meschino. The town is represented in the Massachusetts Senate as a part of the Plymouth and Norfolk district, which includes the towns of Cohasset, Duxbury, Hingham, Hull, Marshfield Norwell and Weymouth.

Scituate is governed on the local level by the open town meeting form of government, and is led by a town administrator and a board of selectmen. The town hall, police and fire station 3 are all located in buildings along Route 3A, just down the street from the traditional center of town. There is also a firehouse in Humarock and the Fire Headquarters is on First Parish Rd near Scituate Harbor. Emergency services are also provided by the town, with the nearest hospitals being located in Quincy, Weymouth, Plymouth, and Brockton. There are four post offices throughout the town, located in Humarock, near the harbor, in North Scituate and in Greenbush. The Scituate Town Library is located near Scituate Center, and is a member of the Old Colony Library Network (OCLN). The town also operates a highway department, as well as several parks, beaches and marinas. The Coast Guard also has a station at Scituate Harbor.

In 2002, Scituate voters adopted the Community Preservation Act (CPA) for the acquisition, preservation, restoration or creation of open space, historical purposes, land for recreational use and the creation and support of community housing. 

Education

Scituate's public schools provide co-ed classes for grades K–12. Hatherly Elementary School, Cushing Elementary School, Wampatuck Elementary School and (the most recently opened) Jenkins Elementary School serve grades K–5, the newly opened Lester J. Gates Middle School, which bears the same name as the old Intermediate school, serves grades six through eight and was opened just in time for the 2017–2018 school year. Scituate High School serves 9–12. Scituate High's teams are known as the Sailors, and their colors are blue, white, and black.  The teams compete in the MIAA's Divisions 2 and 3, in the Patriot League. Their chief rivals are Norwell and Cohasset, whom they border, and Hingham, whom they play in their annual Thanksgiving Day football game.

High school students may also choose to attend South Shore Vocational Technical High School in Hanover free of charge.  Also, many students, specifically in high school, commute to private schools in and around Boston, most commonly, Thayer Academy and Archbishop Williams in Braintree, Boston College High School (boys only) in Dorchester, and Notre Dame Academy (girls only) in Hingham. Boston College High enrolled 61 young men from Scituate in the 2005–06 school year.

Culture

St. Patrick's Day Parade
The annual St. Patrick's Day Parade takes place on the third Sunday in March and runs from Greenbush-Driftway to Scituate Harbor. In addition to the parade, the celebration includes the Mad Hatter's Ball, the Annual Mayor's Race, and the St. Pat's Plunge into the chilly Atlantic Ocean at Peggotty Beach. These events are fundraisers for local charities. With nearly 50% of Scituate residents being of Irish descent, St. Patrick's Day festivities are a local favorite.

According to the official parade website, the parade began in Minot, Massachusetts, in 1995 as a small procession around the block to celebrate St. Patrick's Day.

Heritage Days
An annual outdoor event in the Scituate Harbor area featuring live music, entertainment, artisan crafts, kids activities and historical site visits.
The event takes place for one weekend in the month of August.

Scituate is mentioned as a good fishing spot in Nathaniel Hawthorne's short story, The Village Uncle.

Notable people

 Abigail Bates, half of the "American Army of Two," fended off the British army near the Scituate lighthouse with a fife and drum during the War of 1812 (Fortier, Edmund A, An Army of Two Saves the Day) along with Rebecca
 Rebecca Bates, other half of the "American Army of Two"
 Brittany Brown, International Ladies Professional Wrestling multi-time champion and title holder. Brown was Trained by the legendary Killer Kowalski and WWF/WWE long-time Women’s Champion The Fabulous Moolah. Brown was born and raised in Scituate, MA near Scituate Harbor
 Gridley Bryant, builder of the first commercial railroad in the United States and inventor of most of the basic technologies involved in it
 George W. Casey, Jr., Chief of Staff of the United States Army (2007–2011)
 Thomas Clapp, first President of Yale University
 Paul Curtis, shipbuilder known for his clipper ships
 William Cushing, one of the original six justices on the United States Supreme Court
 Casey Dienel, singer-songwriter known as White Hinterland
 Ryan Donato, NHL left wing for the Seattle Kraken
 Ted Donato, former Harvard hockey captain with a 13-year NHL career; won an NCAA championship, played in the Olympics, coaches Harvard hockey
 Henry Dunster, first president of Harvard University, Puritan/Baptist minister
 Tom Fitzgerald, sports journalist with The Boston Globe and recipient of the Lester Patrick Trophy and Elmer Ferguson Memorial Award
 Nick Flynn, writer and poet, whose autobiographical Another Bullshit Night in Suck City was adapted into the 2012 film Being Flynn
 Jacques Futrelle, journalist, author, who died in the sinking of the RMS Titanic in 1912; his wife, fellow writer and Titanic survivor May Futrelle (née Lily May Peel); and their two children
 Conor Garland, NHL winger for the Vancouver Canucks
 Joe Gaziano, NFL Defensive End for the Los Angeles Chargers
 Mark Goddard, actor known for his role as "Major Don West" in the series Lost in Space
 Inez Haynes Irwin, journalist, author, feminist, wrote The Story of the Women's Party, a history of the American woman suffrage movement
 Charles Kerins, artist, illustrator, known for Red Sox yearbook covers and paintings of small town American childhood in the 1950s and 1960s
 Anna Konkle, comedian, raised in Scituate
 Bruce Laird, former NFL football player for Baltimore Colts, 1972–1981 (Pro Bowl 1972), and San Diego Chargers, 1982–1983
 Thomas W. Lawson, stock promoter, financial reformer, built his Dreamwold estate in Scituate
 Mordecai Lincoln Sr., great-great-great-grandfather of U.S. President Abraham Lincoln
 Mordecai Lincoln Jr., great-great-grandfather of U.S. President Abraham Lincoln
  Jim Lonborg, Cy Young Award–winning former Major League Baseball starting pitcher for the Boston Red Sox
 Joseph D. Malone, former Massachusetts treasurer
 Tom McCall, Governor of Oregon from 1966–1974, born in Scituate
 John McDonald, Major League Baseball infielder
 Scott McMorrow, award-winning playwright and poet
 Mike Palm, (relief pitcher) 1948 Boston Red Sox
 Frank Craig Pandolfe, retired Vice Admiral United States Navy (1980–2017)
 Walter Jay Skinner, U.S. federal district judge, presided over Anderson v. Cryovac, Inc., private practice in Scituate, 1957–1963
 Dave Silk, former NHL ice hockey forward, member of the Miracle on Ice 1980 U.S. Olympic hockey team that won the gold medal
 Scott Snibbe, media artist, grew up in Scituate
 Billy Tibbetts, former NHL forward
 Peter Tolan, writer, director
 Charles Turner Torrey, abolitionist (1813–1846)
 May Rogers Webster, naturalist born in Scituate
 Ryan Whitney, former NHL defenseman, host of podcast “Spittin' Chiclets”

Gallery

References

External links

 Town of Scituate official website

 
Irish-American culture in Massachusetts
Irish-American neighborhoods
Populated places established in 1630
Populated coastal places in Massachusetts
Towns in Plymouth County, Massachusetts
1630 establishments in Massachusetts
Towns in Massachusetts